is a passenger railway station located in the town of Namegawa, Saitama, Japan, operated by the private railway operator Tōbu Railway.

Lines
All services, (TJ Liner, Rapid express, Rapid, Express, Semi express, Local) stop at this station. During the daytime, the station is served by two Rapid trains and one Express train per hour in each direction to and from Ikebukuro.

Station layout

The station consists of two side platforms serving two tracks.

Platforms

Adjacent stations

History
The station opened on 26 March 2002.

From 17 March 2012, station numbering was introduced on the Tōbu Tōjō Line, with Tsukinowa Station becoming "TJ-31".

Passenger statistics
In fiscal 2019, the station was used by an average of 5,352 passengers daily.

Surrounding area
Saitama Prefectural Namegawa Comprehensive High School
 Namegawa Municipal Tsukinowa Elementary School

See also
 List of railway stations in Japan

References

External links

Tobu station information 

Tobu Tojo Main Line
Stations of Tobu Railway
Railway stations in Saitama Prefecture
Railway stations in Japan opened in 2002
Namegawa, Saitama